Mylothris mortoni is a butterfly in the family Pieridae. It is found in Ethiopia.

Subspecies
Mylothris mortoni mortoni (northern and eastern Ethiopia)
Mylothris mortoni balkis Ungemach, 1932 (western Ethiopia)

References

Butterflies described in 1912
Pierini
Endemic fauna of Ethiopia
Butterflies of Africa